Donald A. MacDonald (ca. 1849 – 9 May 1884) was a farmer and political figure on Prince Edward Island. He represented 3rd Queens in the Legislative Assembly of Prince Edward Island from 1879 to 1882 as a Conservative.

MacDonald lived in French Village, Prince Edward Island. He married Margaret McDonald in 1880. He was elected to the provincial assembly in an 1879 by-election held following the death of Francis Kelly. MacDonald was defeated when he ran for reelection in 1882.

References 

 

1840s births
1884 deaths
Progressive Conservative Party of Prince Edward Island MLAs